Paoli Historic District may refer to:

Paoli Historic District (Paoli, Georgia), listed on the National Register of Historic Places in Madison County, Georgia
Paoli Historic District (Paoli, Indiana), listed on the National Register of Historic Places in Orange County, Indiana